York railway station is on the East Coast Main Line serving the city of York, North Yorkshire, England. , the station is operated by London North Eastern Railway.

York station is a key junction approximately halfway between London and Edinburgh. The junction was historically a major site for rolling stock manufacture, maintenance and repair.

In Britain's 100 Best Railway Stations by Simon Jenkins, the station was one of only ten to be awarded five stars.

History
The first York railway station was a temporary wooden building on Queen Street outside the walls of the city, opened in 1839 by the York and North Midland Railway. It was succeeded in 1841, inside the walls, by what is now York old railway station. In due course, the requirement that through trains between London and Newcastle needed to reverse out of the old York station to continue their journey necessitated the construction of a new through station outside the walls.

The present station, designed by the North Eastern Railway architects Thomas Prosser and William Peachey and built by Lucas Brothers, opened on 25 June 1877. It had 13 platforms and was at that time the largest in the world. As part of the new station project, the Royal Station Hotel (now The Principal York), designed by Peachey, opened in 1878.

In 1909 new platforms were added, and in 1938 the current footbridge was built and the station resignalled.

The building was heavily bombed during the Second World War. On one occasion, on 29 April 1942, 800 passengers had to be evacuated from a King's Cross-Edinburgh train which arrived during a bombing raid. On the same night, two railway workers were killed, one being station foreman William Milner, who died after returning to his burning office to collect his first aid kit. He was posthumously awarded the King's Commendation for Brave Conduct. A plaque in his memory has been erected at the station. The station was extensively repaired in 1947.

The station was designated as a Grade II* listed building in 1968.

The track layout through and around the station was remodelled again in 1988 as part of the resignalling scheme that was carried out prior to the electrification of the ECML shortly afterwards by British Rail. This resulted in several bay platforms (mainly on the eastern side) being taken out of service and the track to them removed. Consequently, the number of platforms was reduced from 15 to 11. At the same time a new signalling centre (York IECC) was commissioned on the western side of the station to control the new layout and also take over the function of several other signal boxes on the main line.

In 2006–7, to improve facilities for bus, taxi and car users as well as pedestrians and cyclists, the approaches to the station were reorganised. The former motive power depot and goods station now house the National Railway Museum.

The station was renovated in 2009. Platform 9 has been reconstructed and extensive lighting alterations were put in place. New automated ticket gates (similar to those in Leeds) were planned, but the City of York Council wished to avoid spoiling the historic nature of the station. The then operator National Express East Coast planned to appeal the decision but the plans were scrapped altogether upon handover to East Coast.

Stationmasters

Edward Oates ca 1850–1880 
William Lackenby 1880–1890
John Bradford Harper 1890–1893
Samuel Holliday 1893–1897  (afterwards stationmaster at Newcastle)
James Brown 1897–1902 
William Thompson 1902–1913  (afterwards stationmaster at Newcastle)
Thomas Clements Humphrey 1913–1923  (afterwards stationmaster at Newcastle)
Frank Wilfred Wheddon 1923–1926
Harry A. Butcher 1926–1932 (afterwards stationmaster at Newcastle)
George W. Pattinson 1932–1939
Edwin Oliver Wright 1941–1946
G. W. Anson 1946–1949
W. H. Burton 1949–1950 (afterwards station master at Newcastle)
Harold Gardner 1950–1953

Accidents and incidents
On 31 March 1920, a passenger train was derailed as it entered platform 8.
On 5 August 1958, a passenger train crashed into the buffers at platform 12.
On 18 January 2006, a freight train wagon derailed on points entering platform 3 before re-railing 400 sleepers later causing extensive damage to trackworks through the station. The derailment happened due to faulty suspension on one of the bogies causing the load to sit unevenly across the axles, lifting the axle off the tracks as it went round the corner over the points.

Layout

All the platforms except 9, 10 and 11 are under the large, curved, glass and iron roof. They are accessed via a long footbridge (which also connects to the National Railway Museum) or via lifts and either of two pedestrian tunnels. Between April 1984 and 2011 the old tea rooms housed the Rail Riders World/York Model Railway exhibition.

Platforms 
The platforms at York have been renumbered several times, the most recent being in the late 1980s to coincide with a reduction in the number of platforms from 15 to 11. The current use is:
Platform 1: South-facing bay platform mostly used for services to Hull and Bridlington or  via  and for stabling empty stock.
Platform 2: North-facing bay platform connected only to the Scarborough branch, used mostly for stabling a spare TransPennine Express unit along with the accompanying station siding.
Platform 3: Main southbound platform, but is signalled bi-directionally, accessible directly from the station concourse. Fast and semi-fast southbound London North Eastern Railway for  generally use this platform. CrossCountry services, Grand Central and some westbound TransPennine Express services also use it.
Platform 4: Northward continuation of platform 3 connected only to the Scarborough branch, used by TransPennine Express services from Scarborough.
Platform 5 (split into 5a and 5b): Main northbound platform (but is signalled bi-directionally). Fast northbound London North Eastern Railway services to Scotland use this and generally call at Darlington and Newcastle only. Accessible by footbridge or tunnel. Also used by some CrossCountry services northbound. North/eastbound TransPennine Express to Scarborough generally use this platform. Southbound London North Eastern Railway services also stop here both fast and semi-fast, the latter of which generally call at Doncaster, Newark, Peterborough and London King's Cross.
Platform 7: South-facing bay platform used mostly by Northern commuter services and London North Eastern Railway services to/from London Kings Cross.
Platform 8: North-facing bay platform used almost exclusively by Northern Trains on the Harrogate Line.
Platforms 9, 10, 11: Bi-directional platforms used by semi-fast and some fast London North Eastern Railway services heading north to Newcastle and Scotland, CrossCountry services north and southbound via Leeds, TransPennine Express services westbound to Manchester Piccadilly, Manchester Airport and northbound to Newcastle and Redcar. Some Northern Trains services to Blackpool and Leeds also use this platform.
Platforms 10 and 11 are outside of the main body of the station. Another siding, the former fruit dock, exists opposite platform 11.

Recent developments
The southern side of the station has been given new track and signalling systems. An additional line and new junction was completed in early 2011. This work has helped take away one of the bottlenecks on the East Coast Main Line.

The station has also become the site of one of Network Rail's modern Rail Operation Centres, which opened in September 2014 on land to the west of the station This took over the functions of the former IECC in December 2018 and will eventually control much of the East Coast Main Line from London to the Scottish border and various subsidiary routes across the North East, Lincolnshire and South, North and West Yorkshire.
During Christmas 2020, major track replacement occurred, with Network Rail releasing time lapse footage of the works.

In 2022, work began to redevelop the area outside the station. Queen Street Bridge, built to cross the lines into the old York station within the city walls, will be demolished.

In 2023 a further £10.5 million has been confirmed for the massive revamp of the area at the front of York railway station.

York Central
Located adjacent to the station, York Central is one of the largest city centre brownfield regeneration sites in the UK. The  site has been designated as a UK Government ‘Housing Zone’ and has also been awarded ‘Enterprise Zone’ status, which offers commercial occupiers significant incentives. Outline planning approval was given for the site in March 2019. It is anticipated that development of the full site could take between 15 and 20 years to complete.

Services

The station is operated by London North Eastern Railway and is used by the following train operating companies:

London North Eastern Railway
London North Eastern Railway operates regular services that stop at York between London, Newcastle and Edinburgh. In addition, there are infrequent services to Glasgow, Aberdeen and Inverness. One train per day serves Middlesbrough.
The fastest southbound services run non-stop to London, completing the 188 mile journey in 1 hour and 52 minutes.

Rolling stock used: Inter-City 225 (Class 91 electric locomotive & DVT), Class 800 bi-mode trains and Class 801 electric trains

CrossCountry

Rolling stock used: Inter-City 125 (HST), Class 220 and Class 221 Voyager diesel multiple units.

TransPennine Express
TransPennine Express provides a number of express services across the north of England (to Manchester Piccadilly, Liverpool Lime Street, Newcastle,  and ).

Rolling stock used: Class 185 Desiro diesel multiple units, Class 68 locomotives with Mark 5a coaching stock and Class 802 bi-mode trains

Grand Central
Grand Central runs an open access service between Sunderland and London.

Rolling stock used: Class 180 Adelante trains.

Northern Trains

Northern Trains operates a mostly hourly service towards Hull, Blackpool North and Leeds (both routes) serving most stations en-route (plus three per day to Sheffield via ).

Rolling stock used: Sprinter (Class 150/155/158), Class 170 Turbostar and Civity Class 195 units. Pacer (Class 142/144) diesel multiple units were in regular use on the Harrogate and Sheffield lines until December 2019, but have now been phased out.

Former services
Until May 2021 East Midlands Railway provided one weekend return journey between York and London St Pancras via the Midland Main Line.

Rolling stock used: Class 222 Meridian diesel multiple units.

References

Further reading

External links

 
 
 The Railway Revolution – on 'History of York' website
 , description of the station in the 1930s
  – live webcam

Railway stations in North Yorkshire
Former North Eastern Railway (UK) stations
Railway stations in Great Britain opened in 1877
Railway stations served by CrossCountry
Railway stations served by Grand Central Railway
Northern franchise railway stations
Railway stations served by TransPennine Express
Railway stations served by London North Eastern Railway
Rail transport in York
1877 establishments in England
Grade II* listed buildings in York
Grade II* listed railway stations
Thomas Prosser railway stations
William Bell railway stations
DfT Category A stations